"Hey Pretty Girl" is  a song recorded by American country music artist Kip Moore. It was released in January 2013 as the third single from his debut album, Up All Night. Moore co-wrote the song with Dan Couch. As of June 19, 2013, the single had sold 500,000 copies in the United States  and been certified Gold by the RIAA.

Content
The song is in the key of D major. It tells a story of a man pursuing a woman, dancing with her, then marrying and having a child with her.

Critical reception
Billy Dukes of Taste of Country gave the song five stars out of five, writing that "the singer employs no studio tricks to make his point. He brings you in with a performance as intimate as any you’ll hear this year." Chuck Dauphin of Roughstock gave the song a favorable review, saying that "Kip Moore gets a chance to showcase his vocals for the first time on his new single, rather than just dealing with cute hooks for radio play." In 2017, Dauphin, writing for Billboard, put "Hey Pretty Girl" at number five on his top 10 list of Moore's best songs.

Music video
An acoustic music video, directed by Stephen Shepherd, premiered in April 2012. The official music video, directed by Chris Hicky, premiered in March 2013.

Chart performance
"Hey Pretty Girl" debuted at number 60 on the U.S. Billboard Country Airplay chart for the week of January 19, 2013. It debuted at number 46 on the U.S. Billboard Hot Country Songs chart for the week of February 16, 2013. It debuted at number 97 on the U.S. Billboard Hot 100 chart for the week of April 6, 2013. It debuted at number 98 on the Canadian Hot 100 chart for the week of July 13, 2013.

Year-end charts

Certifications

References

2013 singles
Kip Moore songs
MCA Nashville Records singles
Music videos directed by Chris Hicky
Song recordings produced by Brett James
2012 songs
Songs written by Kip Moore
MCA Records singles
Songs written by Dan Couch